Mr. Write is a 1994 American comedy-drama film directed by Charlie Loventhal and starring Paul Reiser.  It is based on Howard J. Morris's play of the same name.

Cast
Paul Reiser as Charlie Fischer
Jessica Tuck as Nicole Barnes
Doug Davidson as Roger
Jane Leeves as Wylie
Calvert DeForest as Mr. Rhett
Gigi Rice as Shelly
Eddie Barth as Dad
Wendie Jo Sperber as Roz
Darryl M. Bell as Lawrence
Thomas F. Wilson as Billy
Martin Mull as Dan Barnes
Shannon Sturges as Rachel

References

External links
 
 

American comedy-drama films
American films based on plays
1990s English-language films
Films directed by Charlie Loventhal
1990s American films